Charles Dalton (18641942) was an English born stage actor who had a lengthy Broadway career. He made his first stage appearance in 1883 and toured the English provinces for over a decade before heading to New York City in 1896. He appeared in 1896 in a production of Wilson Barrett's The Sign of the Cross. His last Broadway appearance was in 1940 in a production of Richard II.

Filmography
Fighting Odds (1917)
The Wakefield Case (1921)

References

External links

 
 
 
 

1864 births
1942 deaths
Male actors from Kent
19th-century English male actors
English male stage actors
Burials at Kensico Cemetery